A rum runner is a person or ship engaged in the illegal business ofsmuggling alcoholic beverages.

Rum Runner may also refer to:.  
Rum runners on suomeksi salakuljettaja

Go-fast boat, a type of boat used for smuggling illicit alcoholic potables
Rum Runner (nightclub), a nightclub in Birmingham, England
Rum Runners or Boulevard du Rhum, a 1971 French-Italian-Spanish adventure film directed by Robert Enrico

Rum runners on suomeksi salakuljettaja.

See also
Rimrunners (disambiguation)